The Chief Executive Officer of Defence Equipment and Support, formerly the Chief of Defence Materiel, is a senior post in the UK Ministry of Defence created in April 2007. It merges the roles of Chief of Defence Procurement and Chief of Defence Logistics into a single post responsible for leading Defence Equipment and Support.

Postholders
Chief of Defence Materiel
 General Sir Kevin O'Donoghue 2 April 2007–December 2010
 Sir Bernard Gray from 4 January 2011–2015

Chief Executive Officer of Defence Equipment and Support
 Tony Douglas September 2015–January 2018
 Michael Bradley January 2018–May 2018
  Sir Simon Bollom May 2018–September 2022
 Andy Start September 2022 – Present

References

United Kingdom defence procurement
British military appointments